The Carolina Thunderbirds are a minor league professional hockey team located in Winston-Salem, North Carolina, and play in the Federal Prospects Hockey League. Their home games are played at the Winston-Salem Fairgrounds Annex.

History
In August 2016, the Federal Hockey League (FHL) announced that multiple FHL franchise owner Barry Soskin would place an expansion team in Winston-Salem for the 2017–18 FHL season. The team name was announced in September as the Carolina Thunderbirds after the former professional team that had last played in Winston-Salem in 1992. In June 2017, Berlin River Drivers head coach Andre Niec was hired as the Thunderbirds' inaugural head coach.

The team played their first game on October 27, 2017, against the Danville Dashers. The home opener was held on November 3 against the North Shore Knights, a 3–2 victory for the Thunderbirds in front of a sold-out crowd. On January 27, 2018, head coach Niec swung a hockey stick at an official after disagreeing with a call towards the end of a game with the league leading Port Huron Prowlers. The FHL then suspended Niec for 20 games and would be replaced by general manager Scott Brand on an interim basis. Brand would also be suspended for one game after an unsportsmanlike conduct penalty on February 16. Niec returned on March 3

On March 2, 2018, the Thunderbirds broke the single-season Federal Hockey League season attendance record and finished their inaugural season with a total attendance of 66,204 fans, 14,720 higher than the previous record. The third seed Thunderbirds hosted the second-seeded Watertown Wolves on April 13, 2018, in the playoff semifinals, the first playoff game played in the Triad in 10 years, but lost a close game in overtime. The Thunderbirds also lost the following night and were eliminated from the playoffs, although the 3–2 loss to the Wolves in double overtime became the longest game in league history.

The Thunderbirds opened the 2018–19 season on October 26, 2018, at home against the Port Huron Prowlers with 4–3 win. The next night in another game against the Prowlers, head coach Niec was ejected again for arguing with the officials. He was subsequently suspended by the league again for six games (reduced to four), with personal trainer Karolina Huvarova taking over in the interim. Huvarova was reportedly the first European woman to coach a men's professional team.  On November 28, 2018, the Thunderbirds' management received league approval to implement an experimental rule change to hold a five-man shootout prior to the each game instead of only holding a shootout after a game was still tied following overtime. The pre-game shootout rule was left up to a fan vote and was discontinued after only two games. On February 1, 2019, with a 6–3 win over the Danville Dashers, the Thunderbirds tied the 2017–18 Port Huron Prowlers and the 2010–11 New York Aviators FHL record for longest winning streak at 21 games. Josh Pietrantonio became the first player in team history to earned 100 points as a Thunderbird in the game. They broke the winning streak record the following night by defeating the Danville Dashers 4–3, and the streak ended at 24 following a 4–2 loss to the Watertown Wolves on February 9. On March 8, the Thunderbirds won their first regular season championship and secured the FHL's top seed for the 2019 playoffs. Head coach Andre Niec signed a contract for the final game and scored a hat trick in a 7–1 win over the Dashers.

The team won eight league awards for the season. Team captain, Josh Pietrantonio, was named the FHL MVP and for the second consecutive season was one of the players named as Forwards of the Year. He scored 27 goals along with 56 assists for a total of 83 points. Andre Niec was named Coach of the Year after leading the Thunderbirds to a record breaking season with the most wins (49), most points (149), and the best point percentage (.856) in league history. Christian Pavlas was named Goaltender of the Year after leading the FHL in all four major goaltending categories: wins (30), GAA (1.77), save percentage (.932), and shutouts (5). His 30 wins and five shutouts are the most by a goaltender in a single season in league history. Mike Baker was a Defenseman of the Year after joining the team via a trade with Port Huron in December. Karel Drahorad also lead the FHL in goals among defensemen during the season. Forward Jan Salak led the league in plus/minus at +77 for the season. Michael Bunn also lead the league in game winning goals with eight.

On May 15, 2019, inaugural general manager Scott Brand left the Thunderbirds to take on the same role with the FHL expansion team Columbus River Dragons and was replaced by Jimmy Milliken, who had been serving on the league's expansion committee.

In 2018, the FHL began calling itself the Federal Prospects Hockey League (FPHL) and fully rebranded before the 2019–20 season. Part way into the 2019–20 season, general manager Milliken resigned to spend more time with family. The 2019–20 season was curtailed by the COVID-19 pandemic with the Thunderbirds holding the top seed in the standings. Due to the ongoing pandemic, the start of the 2020–21 season was delayed to February 2021. The Thunderbirds were one of four teams to take part in the shortened season, but had to play all games on the road due to their home arena being unavailable. Following the 2020–21 season, head coach Niec left the team to become a European scout for the NHL's Florida Panthers and was replaced by Garrett Rutledge.

Season-by-season results

Source:

Awards

Regular Season MVP
2018–19: Josh Pietrantonio

Commissioner's Cup Playoffs MVP
2019: Michael Bunn

Forward of the Year
2017–18: Josh Pietrantonio
2018–19: Josh Pietrantonio

Defenseman of the Year
2018–19: Mike Baker

Goaltender of the Year
2018–19: Christian Pavlas

Coach of the Year
2018–19: Andre Niec

Executive of the Year
2017–18: Scott Brand
2018–19: Barry Soskin

Broadcaster of the Year
2017–18: Al Kessler
2018–19: Zakharia DeBeaussaert

Goaltender of the Month
November 2018–19: Henry Dill
December 2018–19: Christian Pavlas
February 2018–19: Henry Dill

Rookie of the Month
December 2018–19: Jiri Pargac

Franchise leaders
All-time and season leaders:

All-time regular season
Games played: Michael Bunn, 130
Goals scored: Michael Bunn, 67
Assists: Jan Salak, 99
Points: Jan Salak, 160
Penalty minutes: Dominik Fejt, 332

All-time postseason
Games played: Josh Pietrantonio, Michael Bunn,	Ray Boudiette, Jan Salak, Stanislav Vlasov & Christian Pavlas, 8
Goals scored: Michael Bunn, 6
Assists: Josh Pietrantonio, 14
Points: Josh Pietrantonio, 18
Penalty minutes: Josh Pietrantonio, 20

All-time (including regular season & postseason)
Games played: Michael Bunn, 138
Goals scored: Michael Bunn, 73
Assists: Josh Pietrantonio, 107
Points: Jan Salak, 170
Penalty minutes: Dominik Fejt, 342

Season records
Goals scored: Jan Salak, 29 (2019–20)
Assists: Josh Pietrantonio, 56 (2018–19)
Points: Josh Pietrantonio, 83 (2018–19)
Penalty minutes: Dominik Fejt, 200 (2018–19)

Postseason records
Goals scored: Michael Bunn, 6 (2019)
Assists:  Josh Pietrantonio, 10 (2019)
Points: Josh Pietrantonio, 13 (2019)
Penalty minutes: Josh Pietrantonio, 18 (2019)

Attendance
Average per game:
2017–18: 2,207
2018–19: 2,714
2019–20: 2,831

References

External links
Thunderbirds website

2016 establishments in North Carolina
Federal Prospects Hockey League teams
Ice hockey clubs established in 2016
Ice hockey teams in North Carolina
Sports in Winston-Salem, North Carolina